George Thomas Tidy (born 28 July 1930) was a Scottish former footballer who played as a goalkeeper during the 1950s.

Although he initially started as a centre-half with Royston Rosebery in 1946, he played in goal shortly before being transferred to Edinburgh City during the 1949–50 season. He joined Dunfermline Athletic at the start of the 1951–52 season, who at the time were in the Scottish Football League "B" Division. He made eleven first-team appearances; 9 in the league and 2 in the Supplementary Cup before moving on to Brechin City FC at the start of the 1952-53 season.

Tidy was part of the Brechin City team which won the Scottish Football League "C" Division Championship title in the 1953–54 season and was the youngest member of the team. He was the only member of the Brechin City team to play in all 42 games during the 1952–53 season and all 40 games during the Championship winning season of 1953–54. He was freed at the end of the 1954–55 season and joined junior side Arniston Rangers FC in June 1956. But he returned to Senior football with Berwick Rangers FC in October 1956 making 13 league appearances and 2 in the Scottish Cup before leaving Senior football in August 1957. He then returned to the Junior ranks to complete his playing career with Peebles Rovers FC.

Honours

Brechin City FC
 Scottish Football League Third Division: 1
 1953–54

References

 
 
 
 

1930 births
Living people
Footballers from Edinburgh
Scottish footballers
Royston Rosebery F.C. players
Edinburgh City F.C. (1928) players
Dunfermline Athletic F.C. players
Brechin City F.C. players
Arniston Rangers F.C. players
Berwick Rangers F.C. players
Peebles Rovers F.C. players
Scottish Football League players
Association football goalkeepers